Sparkær railway station is a railway station serving the small railway town of Sparkær in Jutland, Denmark.

The station is located on the Langå-Struer Line from Langå to Struer. It opened in 1865, closed in 1979, but reopened in 2022. It offers direct regional train services to Aarhus and Struer. The train services are operated by the railway company Arriva.

History 
Sparkær station opened on 17 October 1865 with the opening of the Viborg-Skive section of the Langå-Struer railway line. On 27 May 1979 the station was closed, but the station reopened on 11 December 2022.

Operations 
The train services are operated by the mulitinational railway company Arriva. The station offers regional train services to Aarhus and Struer.

See also
 List of railway stations in Denmark

References

Citations

Bibliography

Further reading

External links
 Banedanmark – government agency responsible for maintenance and traffic control of most of the Danish railway network
 Arriva – British multinational public transport company operating bus and train services in Denmark
 Danske Jernbaner – website with information on railway history in Denmark

Railway stations opened in 1865
Railway stations closed in 1979
Railway stations opened in 2022
Railway stations in the Central Denmark Region
1865 establishments in Denmark
2022 establishments in Denmark
Railway stations in Denmark opened in the 21st century